Territorial Assembly elections were held in French Sudan on March 30, 1952. The Sudanese Progressive Party remained the largest party, winning 28 of the 40 Second College seats. The Sudanese Union – African Democratic Rally won the remaining 13. seats

Results

References

French Sudan
1952 in French Sudan
Elections in Mali
Election and referendum articles with incomplete results
March 1952 events in Africa